Kristian Chong is an Australian concert pianist who has performed extensively throughout Australia, the UK, and in China, France, Hong Kong, New Zealand, Singapore, Taiwan, USA, and Africa.

Early life 
His early studies were at the Elder Conservatorium of Music in Adelaide, Australia, where he was accepted at the age of 9 on piano with Stefan Ammer and Noreen Stokes, and violin with Beryl Kimber. He went on to study at the Melbourne Conservatorium of Music under Stephen McIntyre, and then the Royal Academy of Music in London with Piers Lane and Christopher Elton.

His early competition successes included the Symphony Australia Young Performers Award (keyboard) and the Australian National Piano Award.

Career 
Chong has performed extensively throughout Australia and the UK, and in China, France, Hong Kong, New Zealand, Singapore, Taiwan, USA, and Zimbabwe.

Concerto highlights have included Rachmaninoff 3rd with the Sydney Symphony, the Rachmaninoff Rhapsody on a Theme of Paganini in Beijing and Canberra, and Britten with the Adelaide Symphony Orchestra. Recent concerto highlights include Rachmaninoff 3rd, Chopin 2nd, Beethoven's Emperor, Ravel's Left Hand concerto in Melbourne and New Zealand, and Saint-Saêns 2nd with the Melbourne Symphony Orchestra.

Chong has performed often with musicians such as the Tinalley String Quartet and the Australian String Quartet, violinists Sophie Rowell, Natsuko Yoshimoto, cellist Li-Wei Qin, flautist Megan Sterling and baritone Teddy Tahu Rhodes, with whom he has recorded for ABC Classics. Other collaborations include violinists Ilya Konovalov, (concertmaster Israel Philharmonic), Adam Chalabi, Alexandre Da Costa, Dale Barltrop, Jack Liebeck and Vadim Gluzman, violists Christopher Moore and Caroline Henbest, and clarinetists Philip Arkinstall and Michael Collins amongst many others.

Recent festival performances include the Australian Festival of Chamber Music, the Huntington Estate Music Festival for Musica Viva Australia, the Adelaide Festival, Adelaide International Cello Festival, the Xing Hai Festival in Guangzhou, the Port Fairy Spring Music Festival, where Chong performed the complete Rachmaninoff Preludes, the Mimir Chamber Music Festival and the Bangalow Festival. He also completed a cycle of the complete Beethoven piano and violin sonatas with Natsuko Yoshimoto and Sophie Rowell at the Melbourne Recital Centre.

Chong has recorded the complete Rachmaninoff Preludes for piano for ABC Classic FM in May 2011, and has several pending recordings including the Brahms Op. 120 Sonatas for Clarinet and Piano with Philip Arkinstall and with flautist Megan Sterling, works by Miriam Hyde, Anne Boyd, Carl Vine, Frank Martin, Francis Poulenc and Philippe Gaubert.

He currently is based in Melbourne, and teaches piano, chamber music at the Faculty of Fine Arts and Music, University of Melbourne.

References

External links

Year of birth missing (living people)
Place of birth missing (living people)
Living people
Australian classical pianists
Male classical pianists
Alumni of the Royal Academy of Music
Academic staff of the University of Melbourne
21st-century classical pianists
21st-century Australian male musicians
21st-century Australian musicians